Henry Cravell (died 1417), of Dorchester, Dorset, was an English politician.

Family
He was married to a woman named Alice, and they had one daughter.

Career
He was a Member (MP) of the Parliament of England for Dorchester in 1385 and 1386.

References

14th-century births
1417 deaths
English MPs 1385
People from Dorchester, Dorset
English MPs 1386